Alsophila rosenstockii, synonym Cyathea ascendens, is a species of tree fern native to northeastern New Guinea, where it grows in rain forest at an altitude of 800–1000 m. The erect trunk is slim and 1–2 m tall. Fronds are bi- or tripinnate and may be over 1 m in length. They form a distinctive open crown. The stipe is covered in glossy scales with pale, fragile edges. Sori occur near the midvein of fertile pinnules and lack indusia.

References

rosenstockii
Endemic flora of New Guinea